Monodactylus argenteus is a species of fish in the family Monodactylidae, the moonyfishes. Its common names include silver moonyfish, or silver moony, butter bream, and diamondfish. It is native to the western Pacific and Indian Oceans, including the Persian Gulf, Red Sea, and associated estuaries, such as the Mekong Delta.

This species reaches a maximum length of about 27 centimeters. It is bright shiny silver with yellowish edges to the fins. The dorsal and anal fins have black tips. Juveniles have more yellow coloration and are distinguished by two vertical black bands.

This species occurs in a wide variety of habitat types, including the open ocean, brackish waters, and the freshwater habitat of rivers. In Australia it can be found in harbors and estuaries around piers. Its ability to survive in a wide range of salinities makes it a model organism in the study of salinity tolerance. Juveniles are especially tolerant to salinity changes, easily maintaining homeostasis in variable environments such as estuaries.

Although the silver moony displays territorial behavior, the species can be kept in saltwater aquaria and is easy to rear in captivity. It can remain solitary or form schools. It is a detritivore and planktivore.

The myxozoan parasite Kudoa monodactyli was first described from and named after this fish.

References

External links
 

Monodactylidae
Fish described in 1758
Taxa named by Carl Linnaeus